The Windy City Bulls are an American professional basketball team in the NBA G League based in Hoffman Estates, Illinois, and are affiliated with the Chicago Bulls. The Bulls play their home games at Now Arena,  from Chicago. It became the thirteenth D-League team to be owned by an NBA team.

History
In October 2015, the Chicago Bulls began pursuing an expansion franchise in nearby Hoffman Estates to play in the Sears Centre Arena in time for the 2016–17 season. On November 9, 2015, the Hoffman Estates board unanimously approved the Bulls' proposed NBA Development League (D-League) team.

The team received its name through a contest on the Chicago Bulls' website. Fans submitted about 3,600 suggestions, which were narrowed down to three finalists: Great Lakes Bulls, Heartland Bulls and Windy City Bulls. Windy City was announced as the winner in a pep rally/press conference on February 24, 2016.

The D-League rebranded as the NBA G League, after a league-wide sponsorship by Gatorade, in 2017. Their home arena was renamed Now Arena in 2020.

Season-by-season

Current roster

Head coaches

NBA affiliates
Chicago Bulls (2016–present)

References

External links
 

 
2015 establishments in Illinois
Basketball teams established in 2015
Basketball teams in Chicago
Chicago Bulls
Events in Hoffman Estates, Illinois